Psi Tauri, which is Latinized from ψ Tauri, is a solitary star in the zodiac constellation of Taurus. It has a yellow-white hue and is visible to the naked eye with an apparent visual magnitude of +5.22. It is drifting further away with a radial velocity of +9 km/s.

This object is an F-type main sequence star with a stellar classification of F1 V, which indicates it is undergoing core hydrogen fusion. It is about 1.4 billion years old and is spinning with a projected rotational velocity of 45 km/s. The star has 1.6 times the mass and radius of the Sun. It is radiating 4.8 times the Sun's luminosity from its photosphere at an effective temperature of 7,088 K.

References

F-type main-sequence stars
Tauri, Psi
Taurus (constellation)
Durchmusterung objects
Tauri, 042
025867
019205
1269